Helen A. Chiarello Szabo (April 17, 1923 – August 11, 2015) was an American politician who served in the New Jersey General Assembly from the 13th Legislative District from 1976 to 1978.

Szabo took office in a 1976 special election to succeed S. Howard Woodson, who resigned to head the New Jersey Civil Service Commission. In turn, Szabo stepped down to become the superintendent of elections in Mercer County and was succeeded in a November 1978 special election by Gerald R. Stockman.

Szabo died in New Jersey on August 11, 2015, at the age of 92.

References

1923 births
2015 deaths
Democratic Party members of the New Jersey General Assembly
Politicians from Trenton, New Jersey
Women state legislators in New Jersey
20th-century American politicians
20th-century American women politicians